Vossen is a Dutch patronymic surname most common in Belgian and Dutch Limburg. Notable people with the surname include:

Elli Vossen, pseudonym of Bep Voskuijl (1919–1983), Dutch secretary who helped conceal Anne Frank
Jelle Vossen (born 1989), Belgian footballer
Peter van Vossen (born 1968), Dutch footballer
Piek Vossen (born 1960), Dutch academic
Stephan Cohn-Vossen (1902–1936), German mathematician
Vosse
Michael Vosse (1941–2014), American music journalist and publicist
 (born 1972), Belgian race car driver

See also
Vos (surname)

References

Dutch-language surnames
Patronymic surnames